RKO Keith's Theater may refer to:
RKO Keith's Theater (Richmond Hill, Queens), est. 1929
RKO Keith's Theater (Flushing, Queens), est. 1928
Boston Opera House (1980), est. 1928 as the RKO Keith's Theater in Boston

See also 
 RKO Boston Theatre, est. 1925, a different Boston theater operated by RKO